Gilles Paul Esnault is a French figurative (hyperrealist) painter. His multifaceted  work comprises contemporary street scenes (motorcycles, mechanical details), in the style of the American hyperrealists. It also comprises genre  paintings and  landscapes as well as portraits more akin to the style of itinerant
Russian realists (peredvizhniki) painters of the 19th century.

Exhibition at the salon des Indépendants – Espace Champerret – Paris April/May 2006  – "One second in Paris" 1.95×1.30 m (76 × 51 in)
Exhibition Salon des artistes Indépendants de Paris 2008 – Espace Champerret 11–16 April 2008

Exhibition

 Salon des Indépendants – Avril/mai 2006 PARIS
Exhibition Salon des artistes Indépendants de Paris 2008 – Espace Champerret 11–16 April 2008

External links
 Le marché de l'art – 8/10/2005 Drouot – L'industrie du troisième millénaire – 6 au 12 Octobre 2005
 ANAP Academia Nacional de Artes Plàsticas Sao Paulo
 Hyperrealisme.Online
 Art Actif
 Website about Gilles Paul ESNAULT
 "Une seconde à Paris"
 Galerie du château

21st-century French painters
21st-century French male artists
French male painters
Living people
Year of birth missing (living people)